The 2015 Morocco Tennis Tour – Casablanca II was a professional tennis tournament played on clay courts. It was the first edition of the tournament which was part of the 2015 ATP Challenger Tour. It took place in Casablanca, Morocco between 12 and 17 October 2015.

Singles main-draw entrants

Seeds

 1 Rankings are as of October 5, 2015.

Other entrants
The following players received wildcards into the singles main draw:
  Yassine Idmbarek
  Hicham Khaddari
  Amine Ahouda
  Younès Rachidi

The following player received entry using a special exemption:
  Kamil Majchrzak

The following player received entry into the singles main draw using a protected ranking:
  Javier Martí

The following players received entry from the qualifying draw:
  Laslo Đere
  Danilo Petrović
  Maxime Hamou
  Marcin Gawron

Champions

Singles

  Damir Džumhur def.  Daniel Muñoz de la Nava, 3–6, 6–3, 6–2.

Doubles

  Laurynas Grigelis /  Mohamed Safwat def.  Thiemo de Bakker /  Stephan Fransen, 6–4, 6–3.

References

Morocco Tennis Tour - Casablanca II